China Energy Engineering Corporation or Energy China (CEEC), is a Chinese state-owned energy conglomerate, with headquarters in Chaoyang District, Beijing.

History 
The conglomerate was established on September 29, 2011, with the approval of the State Council of China. It is under direct supervision of the State-owned Assets Supervision and Administration Commission (SASAC). Its major group companies include the China Gezhouba Group Corporation (CGGC), China Power Engineering Consulting Group Corporation (CPECC), Electric Power Planning & Engineering Institute (EPPEI), China Energy Equipment Co., Ltd., the Engineering Department (14 design & survey institutes in 14 provinces, municipalities and autonomous regions), and the Construction Department (22 construction enterprises in 15 provinces, municipalities and autonomous regions).

In November 2015, the company announced its IPO on the Hong Kong Stock Exchange.

References

External links

 China Energy Engineering Corporation Limited 
 Corporate global website 

Energy companies of China
2011 establishments in China